Jarlshola is a small cave in the municipality of Melhus in Trøndelag county, Norway.  The cave is near the small farm of Rimul in the village of Melhus.  It is thought to be the hiding place of Håkon Sigurdsson (also known as Hákon Sigurðsson, Hákon Earl) and Tormod Kark (or Þormóðr Karkr, the slave of the Jarl) on their last night before the infamous murder at Rimul.

History
In the Saga of king Olaf Tryggvason in the Heimskringla, by Snorri Sturluson, there is a description of the arrival and departure from the cave (several lines about a dream the Earl had are left out in this excerpt):

Location

Since the mentioned happenings took place around year 995 AD, it has not been possible to determine beyond doubt the exact location of the cave. However, as one knows it was close to the still existing farm Rimul, there is only one location seeming to fit with the story. That is on the west side of the river Gaula near central Melhus in Trøndelag county, Norway. The cave is easily reached by foot.

References

External links
 Saga of king Olaf Tryggvason 

Melhus
Caves of Norway
Landforms of Trøndelag
History of Trøndelag